Olímpio Ferreira Chaves was one of the first group of pilots who flew for the Portuguese Military Air Force, and a Major in the Portuguese Army.

Biography
Military aviation was officially constituted in Portugal in 1914, with the creation of the Military Aviation School (Army) and Naval Aviation  (Navy), by a committee of members of the Aero Club de Portugal. To attract volunteers for the Vila Nova da Rainha Flight School, in March 1917 Captain Norberto Guimarães made a propaganda flight on board a Nieuport Ni.83 E-2, with stopovers in various cities, ending in the city of Viana do Castelo. Many officers of military units were inspired to join by this flight and from this initial group the first military pilots course began at the Vila Nova da Rainha Flight School.

Olímpio Ferreira Chaves received his military pilot's licence on 10 May 1917, at a session held at the Lisbon Geographic Society, where licences were also awarded to 12 other of the first cohort of Portuguese Air Force pilots and were Azeredo e Vasconcelos, José Manuel Sarmento de Beires, Sousa Gorgulho, João Luís de Moura, Luís Cunha e Almeida, António Cunha e Almeida, Miguel Paiva Simões, Pereira Gomes J., Rosário Gonçalves, Duvale Portugal, Aurélio Castro e Silva and José Joaquim Ramires.

Olímpio Ferreira Chaves published Noções elementares de aviação (Elementary Notions on Aviation) in 1918, the first Portuguese manual on piloting aircraft and instructions on mechanical care of aircraft.

He finished his military career as a Major in the Infantry.

Family
He was a brother of Maria Alexandrina Pires Ferreira Chaves, civil engineer and inventor Raul Pires Ferreira Chaves and João Carlos Pires Ferreira Chaves, and uncle of engineer Maria Amélia Chaves, Fernando de Sousa Ferreira Chaves, architect Jorge Ferreira Chaves and Maria Helena da Costa Dias.

Published works
Noções elementares de Aviação. Lisbon: Papelaria, Livraria e Tipografia Fernandes. 1918.

References

Bibliography
 MATEUS, Henrique Henriques - Os Primórdios da Aviação em Portugal. ('The Beginnings of Aviation in Portugal)

External links
 Moments in History (Momentos de História) “Aviação Militar: A Formação do Corpo Aéreo Militar do CEP” ("Military Aviation: Formation of a Military Air Corps of the CEP") 
 Republica mais “Portugal 1910” 
 Air Museum (Museu do Ar'') “Os Pioneiros” ("The Pioneers") 

Year of birth missing
Year of death unknown
Portuguese aviators
Aviation pioneers